Charles Bouvier (24 August 1898 – October 1964) was a Swiss footballer and bobsledder. He won gold in the four-man bobsleigh at the 1936 Winter Olympics.

Football career
Bouvier began his career in football as a full-back, playing for Swiss club Servette FC. Bouvier also appeared for the Switzerland national team, earning five caps.

At the 1924 Summer Olympics in Paris, Bouvier was a member of the Switzerland squad in football which won the silver medal, finishing as runners-up to Uruguay. However, he did not appear during the tournament.

Bobsleigh career
Bouvier won a gold medal in the four-man bobsleigh at the 1936 Winter Olympics in Garmisch-Partenkirchen and finished seventh in the two-man event at those same games.

He also won a silver medal in the four-man event at the 1935 FIBT World Championships in St. Moritz.

References

External links

1936 bobsleigh two-man results
Bobsleigh four-man Olympic medalists for 1924, 1932–56, and since 1964
Bobsleigh four-man world championship medalists since 1930
DatabaseOlympics.com profile

1898 births
1964 deaths
Swiss male bobsledders
Olympic bobsledders of Switzerland
Bobsledders at the 1936 Winter Olympics
Olympic gold medalists for Switzerland
Olympic medalists in bobsleigh
Olympic medalists in football
Medalists at the 1936 Winter Olympics
Swiss men's footballers
Switzerland international footballers
Servette FC players
Association football fullbacks
Olympic silver medalists for Switzerland
Medalists at the 1924 Winter Olympics
Olympic footballers of Switzerland
Footballers at the 1924 Summer Olympics
Medalists at the 1924 Summer Olympics